Carmen Wüstenhagen (born 15 August 1973) is a German middle-distance runner. She competed in the women's 1500 metres at the 1996 Summer Olympics.

References

1973 births
Living people
Athletes (track and field) at the 1996 Summer Olympics
German female middle-distance runners
Olympic athletes of Germany
Place of birth missing (living people)
20th-century German women